Chilcotin Forest is an unincorporated settlement in the Chilcotin District of the Central Interior of British Columbia, Canada.  It is located near Canadian Forces Camp Chilcotin and was also originally named Ninkynee, meaning "Indian's Own" in the Chilcotin language, a reference to it being the location of the Chilcotin Forest Indian Training Centre, but this name was met with opposition by local non-native residents shortly after its designation in 1967.

References

Populated places in the Chilcotin
Unincorporated settlements in British Columbia